Fountain Square Academy was a free public charter school for grades 6–12 in Indianapolis, Indiana.  It offered a "Middle College" program that allowed qualifying high school students to take college courses for college credit at Ivy Tech Community College at no additional cost while still enrolled in high school.

The school was closed after the 2011–2012 school year when Greg Ballard, the mayor of Indianapolis, declined, in March 2011, to renew its charter due to lack of academic progress.

References

External links 
 Fountain Square Academy

Charter schools in Indiana
Schools in Indianapolis
Public high schools in Indiana
Public middle schools in Indiana
Fountain Square, Indianapolis